A constitutional referendum was held in Tajikistan on 22 May 2016. A total of 41 constitutional amendments were proposed. The changes included:
amending Article 65 to remove presidential term limits for Emomali Rahmon
reducing the minimum age to run for president from 35 to 30
banning political parties based on religious platforms
According to official figures, the changes were approved by 96.6% of voters. Voter turnout was claimed to be 92%.

Analysis
On a practical level, incumbent President Emomali Rahmon would be allowed to run for re-election indefinitely under the changes. Rahmon has been the President of Tajikistan for close to a quarter of a century, showing what critics say was an increased disregard for religious freedoms, civil society, and political pluralism in recent years.

The reduction in minimum age to run for president allows Rahmon's son to run, because he would be 33 at the end of his father's current term. The religious party restriction most notably impacts the main opposition Islamic Renaissance Party, which was outlawed in 2015. Some analysts claim that the changes violate the terms of the peace deal that ended the Tajikistani Civil War.

Conduct
According to Reporters Without Borders, the Tajik government had been "blocking", "intimidating" and "threatening" independent media in the buildup to the referendum. According to Sergey Sirotkin, who headed the Russian observing mission, "[t]he referendum was held in full compliance with the laws". Observers from the Organization for Security and Co-operation in Europe and its subsidiary ODIHR were denied entry and permission to observe the referendum.

Over 3,200 polling stations were placed in the country, with additional posts available in several major Russian cities for Tajik expatriates.

Results
Voters were presented with the question: "Do you approve amendments to the country’s constitution?" Under the country’s law, the referendum result is valid if more than half of voters approved it.

References

Referendums in Tajikistan
Tajikistan
2016 in Tajikistan
Constitutional referendums